Richard Davies (born 22 July 1944) is an English musician, singer and songwriter best known as founder, vocalist and keyboardist of the rock band Supertramp. Davies was its only constant member, and composed some of the band's best known songs, including "Rudy", "Bloody Well Right", "Crime of the Century" , "From Now On", "Ain't Nobody But Me", "Gone Hollywood", "Goodbye Stranger", "Just Another Nervous Wreck", "Cannonball", and "I'm Beggin' You". He is generally noted for his rhythmic blues piano solos and jazz-tinged progressive rock compositions and cynical lyrics.

Starting with the self-titled  Supertramp in 1970, Davies shared lead vocals with Supertramp songwriting partner Roger Hodgson until the latter's departure in 1983, at which point he became the sole lead vocalist of the group. Davies's voice is deeper than Hodgson's, and he usually employs a raspy baritone which stands in stark contrast to his bandmate's tenor. However, he occasionally sings in a falsetto which superficially resembles Hodgson's vocals, such as on "Goodbye Stranger" and "My Kind of Lady".

Biography and career

Early life
Richard Davies was born in Swindon, Wiltshire in 1944 to Betty and Dick Davies. Betty was a hairdresser and ran a salon, and Dick was a merchant navy man, who died in 1973. Rick went to Sanford Street School and, according to mother Betty: "Music was the only thing he was any good at at school."

His first musical stirrings were at the age of eight, when his parents gave him a secondhand radiogram which included a few records left by the previous owner. Among them were Drummin' Man by drumming legend Gene Krupa, and, in Davies's own words, "it hit like a thunderbolt". "I must have played it 2,000 times," he said. "That was it." A friend of the family made Rick a makeshift drum kit out of a biscuit tin, and at the age of 12 he joined the British Railways Staff Association Brass and Silver Jubilee Band as a snare drummer. In an interview in 2002 he said: "As a kid, I used to hear the drums marching along the street in England, in my home town, when there was some kind of parade, and it was the most fantastic sound to me. Then, eventually, I got some drums and I took lessons. I was serious about it... I figured if I could do that – I mean a real drummer, read music and play with big bands, rock bands, classical, Latin, and know what I was going to do – I would be in demand and my life was set... Eventually, I started fiddling with the keyboards, and that seemed to go over better than my drumming, for some reason. So you've gotta go with what people react to." He never had lessons for keyboards, but, according to Betty Davies, "taught himself most of what he knows about music".

By 1959, his attention had been captured by rock 'n' roll, and he joined a band called Vince and the Vigilantes. In 1962, while studying in the art department at Swindon College, he formed his own band, called Rick's Blues, and was now playing a Hohner electric piano instead of drums. The band included Gilbert O'Sullivan on drums for a time; he later was the best man at Davies's wedding. In a March 1972 interview, O'Sullivan said "Rick had originally taught me how to play the drums and piano – in fact, he taught me everything about music." When his father became ill, Davies disbanded Rick's Blues, left college, and took a job as a welder at Square D, a firm making industrial control products and systems, which had a factory on the Cheney Manor Trading Estate in Swindon. Any hopes of an artistic career were temporarily put on ice.

In 1966 he became the organist for The Lonely Ones (best known for being one of Noel Redding's first bands, though Redding had left by the time Davies joined), who later changed their name to The Joint and recorded the soundtracks for a number of German films. He later confessed that he lied about his abilities to get into the group, admitting he couldn't actually play the organ at the time. While the band was in Munich, Davies met Dutch millionaire Stanley August Miesegaes, who offered to fund him if he started a new group.

Supertramp

Davies decided to form a new band, and returned home from Switzerland to place an ad in the music magazine Melody Maker in August 1969. Roger Hodgson was auditioned and, despite their contrasting backgrounds – Davies's working class upbringing and Hodgson's private school education – they struck up an instant rapport and began writing virtually all of their songs together. The band was initially called Daddy, but renamed Supertramp in January 1970.

Supertramp became one of the first acts to sign to the emerging UK branch of A&M Records and by the summer of 1970 they had recorded their first album, simply called Supertramp. Hodgson performed most of the lead vocals on this first effort but by the time of their second album Indelibly Stamped, Davies had stepped up as a singer with he and Hodgson sharing lead vocal duties equally.

After five years with Davies and Hodgson as the mainstays of a continuously changing group, Supertramp settled into a stable lineup and recorded Crime of the Century, which finally brought them critical and commercial success when it was released in 1974. It reached number four in the UK Albums Chart. Though their singles were only moderately successful, their albums consistently scored high in the charts. Davies's relationship with Hodgson was changing and the two began writing most of their songs separately again, though they agreed to have them all credited to Davies/Hodgson by contract. Among the songs credited to both but actually written solely by Davies are the hits "Bloody Well Right" and "Goodbye Stranger".

The group had relocated to the United States by 1977 and it was there that they recorded their best-selling album, Breakfast in America from April 1978 to February 1979. Davies and Hodgson were observed by engineer Peter Henderson to be getting along "fantastically well and everyone was really happy" throughout the long months of recording and mixing. Davies is credited with writing the answering lyric in the second chorus of Hodgson's "The Logical Song". With more hit singles than their first five albums combined, the album reached number three in the UK, and top of the charts in America.

Hodgson quit Supertramp in 1983. Davies' relationship with him had deteriorated and the group's last hit before his departure, "My Kind of Lady", featured little involvement from Hodgson as either a writer or performer. The song was a showcase for Davies's vocal range, with him singing in everything from a booming bass to a piercing falsetto to his natural raspy baritone. With Davies firmly at the helm, Supertramp returned to a more non-commercial, progressive rock-oriented sound with the album Brother Where You Bound and had another hit with "Cannonball". The band continued to tour and record for another five years before disbanding, with a mutual agreement between the members that Supertramp had run its course.

In 1997, during work on what would have been his first solo album, Davies decided to reform Supertramp. The band promptly returned to recording and touring, which yielded another two studio albums before they split again. Supertramp reunited in 2010 for their 70–10 tour. A 2015 tour was announced but ultimately cancelled due to Davies' health issues, battling Multiple Myeloma.

In late August 2018, Rick Davies gave a rare interview in which he expressed that, for the most part, he has overcome his health problems and enjoys playing music again, something he couldn't do around 2016, when he was under medical treatment. Indeed, Davies can be seen performing a few tracks as Ricky and the Rockets in a rehearsal/sound check at a bar, with Supertramp's current members at his side. However, he also stated that it was unlikely that they would ever perform again as Supertramp. Ricky and the Rockets performed another show, this time on 10 June 2022 at the Stephen Talkhouse in Amagansett, New York.

Personal life
Davies married Sue (who has been Supertramp's manager since 1984) in 1977.

Davies' mother died in late 2008 at a nursing home in Stratton St Margaret. He travelled from his Long Island, New York, home every Christmas to visit her. His last trip back was in January 2009 to organise a memorial service for his mother.

Davies currently owns Rick Davies Productions which is the copyright holder of Supertramp's recordings.

Davies was diagnosed with multiple myeloma and cancelled the band's 2015 tour.

Discography

Supertramp 
 1970 : Supertramp 
 1971 : Indelibly Stamped 
 1974 : Crime of the Century 
 1975 : Crisis? What Crisis? 
 1977 : Even in the Quietest Moments... 
 1979 : Breakfast in America 
 1982 : ...Famous Last Words... 
 1985 : Brother Where You Bound 
 1987 : Free as a Bird 
 1997 : Some Things Never Change 
 2002 : Slow Motion

Collaboration 
 1973 : You And Me from Chick Churchill - With Roger Hodgson, Cozy Powell, Gary Pickford-Hopkins and Martin Barre.

Notes

References

1944 births
Living people
21st-century British male musicians
21st-century organists
21st-century pianists
British harmonica players
British male organists
British male pianists
English baritones
English emigrants to the United States
English expatriates in Switzerland
English keyboardists
English male singer-songwriters
English rock keyboardists
English organists
English rock drummers
English rock pianists
Melodica players
People from Swindon
People with multiple myeloma
Progressive rock keyboardists
Supertramp members